The Bestival 2007 was the fourth installment of the Bestival a boutique music festival at Robin Hill on the Isle of Wight. It was held between 7 and 9 September. Tickets went on general sale on Friday 2 March, around 20,000 have been admitted for general release. Tickets were officially announced as sold out on 12 May.

The Bestival 2007 won the Best Medium Sized Festival award, at the UK Festival Awards. This was the third consecutive award for the Bestival, a feat achieved by no other festival in the awards history to date.

Many of the established features were retained including the Bollywood Bar, Hidden Disco, The Farmers Market, Come Dancing Tent, Bestival 87.7FM, Solar Powered Cinema, The Inflatable Church and the Fancy dress parade. The new features for the 2007 Bestival include:

 Swim to Bestival – A charity initiative involving swimming the Solent with the assistance of Royal Navy lifeguards for protection.
 Club Dada – A cabaret/circus themed club tent
 Laughter Clubs – Inspired by the influx of laughter clubs of India.
 Night of 100 Ukes – A performance of a 100 ukulele players comprising festival goers, organised by the Dulwich Ukulele Club.

BBC Radio 1 broadcast live from the Bestival, they also had a stage present at the Bestival showcasing many talented artists.

2007 marked the launch of Bestival Radio. The station broadcast on-site over the frequency 87.7FM and kept listeners camping at the festival up-to-date on news and events over the weekend. Bestival FM was sponsored by Jokers' Masquerade

There were 14 different musical venues at the Bestival 2007, these are – Main Stage, The Big Top, The Bollywood Bar, House of Bamboo, BBC Introducing..., Hidden Disco, Club Dada, Jestival, Bandstand, Restival, Come Dancing, The Rizla Arena, Time For Tease and Loose Tea Party.

Line up 
There were three surprise guests appearing over the course of the weekend.

Main stage

Friday
Chemical Brothers
 Nathan Detroit
 The Go! Team
 Rev Milo Speedwagon
 Barry Peters
 DJ Dave Grogan
 The Maccabees
 The Levellers
 Holy Goat Soundsystem
 Noisettes
 The Hat
 Adjagas
 Hugo Frusslinky

Saturday
Beastie Boys
 Zane Lowe
 The Cuban Brothers
 Night of 100 Ukes
 Soul II Soul
 Michael Cock
 Madness
 Spank Rock
 Easy Star All-Stars
 The Bees
 Gregory Isaacs
 Billy Bragg
 Fionn Regan

Sunday
Primal Scream
 Rob Da Bank
 Gossip
 Queens of Noise
 Ska Cubano
 Kate Nash
 MC Beardy Man
 Beastie Boys
 DJ Yoda
 Marlena Shaw
 Colin Toogood
 Kitty Daisy & Lewis
 Bat for Lashes

Other Stages

Friday
 Calvin Harris
 Tim Westwood
 Fields
 Jon Hopkins
 John Foxx
 David Guetta
 Architecture in Helsinki

Saturday
 François K
 Simian Mobile Disco
 The Rumble Strips
 Erol Alkan
 Candie Payne
 Robyn
 Annie Mac
 Daedelus
 Foals
 Kid Carpet
 Fujiya & Miyagi
 Phill Jupitus
 Ed Byrne

Sunday
 The Orb
 Dan Le Sac Vs Scroobius Pip
 Róisín Murphy
 Dub Pistols
 Remi Nicole
 Horace Andy

Bestival Spring Launch Parties 
These were a new concept for 2007, allowing people to experience the atmosphere of the Bestival around the country in small gigs. Details of the events are listed below -

Saturday 7 April – Komedia, Brighton 
Feat. The Cuban Brothers, Sombrero Sound System and Lost & Found.

Saturday 14 April – Mayrhofen, Austria 
Feat. Kitty, Daisy & Lewis, The Cuban Brothers, Louie Austen, Rob Da Bank, Dub Pistols and Sombrero Sound System.

Friday 20 April – The Bloomsbury Ballroom, London 
Feat. Candie Payne, Dan Le Sac vs Scroobius Pip, Natty, Planning To Rock, Rob Da Bank, Trojan Sound System, Sombrero Sound System.

Thursday 26 April – The Lizard Lounge, Southampton 
Feat. DJ Yoda and Tommy Gunn.

Saturday 28 April – Turnmills, London 
Feat. Rob Da Bank, Kitty, Daisy and lewis, Dub Pistols and Rodney P.

References

External links 
 Bestival Website
 Night of 100 Ukes Website
 Video of Night of 100 Ukes at Bestival

Music festivals on the Isle of Wight
2007 in British music
2007 in England